Veillons au salut de l'Empire (Let's ensure the salvation of the Empire) was the unofficial French national anthem under Napoleon.

History  
The lyrics were written in the later months of 1791 by Adrien-Simon Boy, who was the chief surgeon of the Army of the Rhine. Boy would only have written the first three verses, as the fourth would be added in 1810 by an unknown author.

The song's melody was from Vous qui d’amoureuse aventure, courez et plaisirs et dangers of the comedic opera Renaud d'Ast (1787) by Nicolas Dalayrac.

Lyrics 

1791 compositions
Songs of the French Revolution
French anthems
National symbols of France
French patriotic songs
Historical national anthems
Napoleon